Legislative elections were held in Israel on 3 November 1959 to elect the 120 members of the fourth Knesset. Mapai remained the dominant party, gaining seven seats. Following the elections, Mapai leader David Ben-Gurion formed ninth government on 17 December 1959. His coalition included the National Religious Party, Mapam, Ahdut HaAvoda, the Progressive Party and the three Israeli Arab parties, Progress and Development, Cooperation and Brotherhood and Agriculture and Development. The government had 16 ministers. Mapai's Kadish Luz became the Speaker of the Knesset.

Voter turnout was 81.6%.

Results

Aftermath
The government collapsed when Ben-Gurion resigned on 31 January 1961, over a motion of no-confidence brought by Herut and the General Zionists in the wake of the Lavon Affair. When  Ben-Gurion was unable to form a new government new elections were called. Serving one year and nine months, the fourth Knesset was the shortest Knesset term until the five-month twenty-first Knesset in 2019.

See also
List of members of the fourth Knesset

References

External links
Historical overview of the Fourth Knesset Knesset website
Elections to the Fourth Knesset Knesset website
Factional and Government Make-Up of the Fourth Knesset Knesset website

Israel
Legislative election
Legislative elections in Israel
November 1959 events in Asia
Israel